Armoy United Football Club was a Northern Irish, intermediate football club, that played in the Northern Ireland Intermediate League, and in the Irish Cup, the club was founded in 1968 and based in Armoy, County Antrim.

Honours

Intermediate honours
Steel & Sons Cup: 1
1977-78

References

Association football clubs in County Antrim
Defunct association football clubs in Northern Ireland
Association football clubs established in 1968
1968 establishments in Northern Ireland